Yuan Haowen also known as Yuan Yishan (遺山/遗山) or “Yuan of Yi Mountain” (1190–1257) was a poet from Xinzhou, in what is now Shanxi province, noted for his poems in the ci and the sanqu forms and for including poems in the sangluan genre of Classical Chinese poetry among his poetic works. Yuan Haowen was the outstanding literary figure of his period, in northern China, excelling at various genres of both prose and poetry: his ci poetry is said to be some of the best of the Jin period writers. Just a few of his sanqu lyrics have survived. Yuan Haowen was born in the Jin dynasty of northern China.

Biography
Yuan Haowen's ancestors were of non-Han origins who changed their surname to Yuan. His father experienced disappointments in life and later led a secluded existence. However he passed on his taste for literature to his son. An uncle who was a government official took the young Yuan along on his official journeys, thus introducing him to some well known places and scenery. He could compose poetry by the age of seven leading people to refer to him as a child prodigy. His uncle also saw to it that he studied with the best teachers. He prospered. Born at the height of the Jin dynasty (1115–1234), he experienced the social unrest and war at the decline of the dynasty. He fled to Henan with his mother when the Jin regime moved their capital. He had served the Jin in a variety of posts, but when the Jin dynasty gave way in favor of the Mongol Yuan Dynasty he no longer sought official appointments and went into retirement. In June, 1233, Yuan Haowen was captured and compelled to go to Shandong. For a time he was a destitute wanderer.

See also
Bai Renfu
Classical Chinese poetry
Classical Chinese poetry forms
Classical Chinese poetry genres
Daming Lake
Shang Ting

Notes

References 
Carpenter, Bruce E. 'Chinese San-ch’ü Poetry of the Mongol Era: I', Tezukayama Daigaku kiyo (Journal of Tezukayama University), Nara, Japan, no. 22, pp. 34–5.
Crump, J. I. (1990). Chinese Theater in the Days of Kublai Khan. (Ann Arbor: Center for Chinese Studies The University of Michigan) .
Davis, A. R. (Albert Richard), Editor and Introduction,(1970), The Penguin Book of Chinese Verse. (Baltimore: Penguin Books).
Hu Qiaomu ed., The Great Encyclopedia of China, Chinese Literature, vol. 2, Beijing-Shanghai, 1986, p. 910.
Lu Weifen and Wu Gengshun ed., Complete Yuan Period Sanqu Lyrics, Liaoning, 2000, vol. 1, pp. 144–51.
Ma Liangchun　and Li Futian ed., The Great Encyclopedia of Chinese Literature, Tianlu, 1991, vol. 2, pp. 495–6.

Jin dynasty (1115–1234) poets
Yuan dynasty poets
1190 births
1257 deaths
Politicians from Xinzhou
Poets from Shanxi
Jin dynasty (1115–1234) politicians